Chãs de Tavares is a former civil parish in the municipality of Mangualde, Portugal. In 2013, the parish merged into the new parish Tavares (Chãs, Várzea e Travanca). It is located 36 kilometres along the A25 road east of Viseu.

References

Former parishes of Mangualde